AP-4 complex subunit beta-1 is a protein that in humans is encoded by the AP4B1 gene.

Function 

The heterotetrameric adaptor protein (AP) complexes sort integral membrane proteins at various stages of the endocytic and secretory pathways. AP4 is composed of 2 large chains, beta-4 (AP4B1, this protein) and epsilon-4 (AP4E1), a medium chain, mu-4 (AP4M1), and a small chain, sigma-4 (AP4S1)

Interactions 

AP4B1 has been shown to interact with AP4M1.

Clinical relevance 

AP4-complex-mediated trafficking plays a crucial role in brain development and functioning.

References

External links
 
 PDBe-KB provides an overview of all the structure information available in the PDB for Human AP-4 complex subunit beta-1

Further reading